Michael Andrew Clayton (born 30 May 1957) is an Australian professional golfer, golf course architect and commentator on the game. He won the 1984 Timex Open on the European Tour and won six times on the PGA Tour of Australasia between 1982 and 1994.

Amateur career
Clayton was born in Melbourne, Victoria. He had a very successful amateur career which included the 1978 Australian Amateur, and the Victorian Amateur in 1977 and 1981.

Professional career
Clayton turned professional in 1981, the same year he joined the Australian Tour. He won his first tour event one year later and would win six more times between then and 1994.

Clayton played on the European Tour from 1982 to 2000, winning the 1984 Timex Open in Biarritz. He also won the 1984 Maekyung Open. His best finish on the Australian Order of Merit was 4th in 1994. He would never lose his playing status until he became eligible for the Australian Senior's Tour.

Clayton was famously brought to attention for his "Infamous Putt", of which resulted in a one stroke penalty. As his putt was traveling towards the hole, Clayton twirled his putter in the air, but it slipped from his hands - he then dived towards the putter to catch it and in doing so, moved the ball with the putter, after which the ball hit him as he lay on the green.

Clayton played on the European Seniors Tour. He was runner-up in the 2009 Jersey Seniors Classic, losing at the third playoff hole to Delroy Cambridge.

Clayton is now a golf course architect, having partnered with Geoff Ogilvy until 2019. In 2020 Clayton formed the firm Clayton, DeVries & Pont with architects Mike DeVries and Frank Pont. 

Clayton designed Barnbougle Dunes in Bridport, Tasmania with Tom Doak and the Ranfurlie course at Amstel Golf Club, along with consultancy work at a number of Australian golf courses.

Clayton also regularly appears on golfing podcasts to discuss the state of the game and golf course architecture.

Amateur wins
1977 Victorian Amateur Championship
1978 Australian Amateur, Korean Amateur
1981 Victorian Amateur Championship, Riversdale Cup, Dutch Amateur

Professional wins (8)

European Tour wins (1)

European Tour playoff record (0–1)

PGA Tour of Australasia wins (6)

Asia Golf Circuit wins (1)

Playoff record
European Senior Tour playoff record (0–1)

Results in major championships

Note: Clayton only played in The Open Championship.

CUT = missed the half-way cut
"T" = tied

Team appearances
Amateur
Australian Men's Interstate Teams Matches (representing Victoria): 1976, 1977, 1978, 1979, 1980

Professional
World Cup (representing Australia): 1982, 1994
Hennessy Cognac Cup (representing the Rest of the World): 1984
Alfred Dunhill Challenge (representing Australasia): 1995

References

External links

Australian male golfers
PGA Tour of Australasia golfers
European Tour golfers
European Senior Tour golfers
Golfers from Melbourne
1957 births
Living people